Linda Mullins is a retired English greyhound trainer. She is a five times champion trainer of Great Britain and was regarded as the leading trainer during the 1990s.

Personal life 
Linda (née Chapelle) trained greyhounds at Eastbach kennels in English Bicknor and then married Pat Mullins. They ran the greyhound business from kennels in Manningtree, Essex and had fours sons; three of which (John, David and Kelly) became trainers in their own right at later dates. The family won the 1978 English Greyhound Derby with Lacca Champion. Pat died during March 1981 which resulted in Linda taking over the kennels. Her sister Jeanne Chapelle was a successful trainer at Oxford Stadium with the JC prefix in the 1960s.

Career 
Linda started as a kennel girl at Wembley and then as a trainer initially raced out of Cambridge Stadium in 1982 before spells at Harringay Stadium and Crayford Stadium. The first Classic race success arrived in 1984 by virtue of a Laurels title with a greyhound called Amenhotep. Linda continued to gain success and switched tracks to Romford Stadium in 1987.
  
She secured the first of three Grand National titles in 1990 and her son David took out a licence at Sunderland in 1991 before Linda gained a contract at Walthamstow Stadium. She secured five consecutive Champion Trainer titles from 1996-2000.

A first English Greyhound Derby final appearance in 1995 was quickly followed by numerous classics with the help of greyhounds such as El Tenor and Palace Issue. In 1999 Linda's Hello Buttons dead heated with Pottos Storm trained by her son David. In 2000, Linda called it a day and retired, her son John took over the licence.

Awards
She won the Greyhound Trainer of the Year for five consecutive in 1996-2000 and won the Trainers Championship three times in 1991, 1993 and 1997.

References 

Living people
British greyhound racing trainers
Year of birth missing (living people)